Hemoglobin subunit gamma-1 is a protein that in humans is encoded by the HBG1 gene.

Function 
The gamma globin genes (HBG1 and HBG2) are normally expressed in the fetal liver, spleen and bone marrow. Two gamma chains together with two alpha chains constitute fetal hemoglobin (HbF) which is normally replaced by adult hemoglobin (HbA) in the year following birth. In the non-pathological condition known as hereditary persistence of fetal hemoglobin (HPFH), gamma globin expression is continued into adulthood. Also, in cases of beta-thalassemia and related conditions, gamma chain production may be maintained, possibly as a mechanism to compensate for the mutated beta-globin. The two types of gamma chains differ at residue 136 where glycine is found in the G-gamma product (HBG2) and alanine is found in the A-gamma product (HBG1). The former is predominant at birth. The order of the genes in the beta-globin cluster is: 5' - epsilon – gamma-G – gamma-A – delta – beta - 3'.

References

Further reading

External links 
 

Hemoglobins